Lost Years: A People's Struggle for Justice is a 2011 documentary directed by Kenda Gee and Tom Radford. The film premiered on December 5, 2011, at the Guangzhou International Documentary Film Festival, where it won the Best Documentary Award for history and culture. The film also aired as a two-part, national television mini-series for the Canadian Broadcasting Corporation. A series of extended episodes subsequently aired on CTV Two Alberta, June 8 and 15, 2013, with repeat broadcasts on November 16 and 23.

Gee and Radford began work on the film in late 1999, taking twelve years to fully research the movie. Of the film, Gee and Radford stated that they were "originally inspired by the tale of Larry Kwong of Vernon".

Synopsis
The documentary centres on the family story of director Kenda Gee and the last 150 years of the Chinese diaspora in Canada, the United States, New Zealand, and Australia. The movie begins documenting Gee's ancestors from 1910 China, further progressing through the years focusing on the racism that they and other Chinese emigrants experienced, and culminating with Hanson Lau and Gee's leadership in the campaign to redress the Chinese Head tax in Canada and abroad. The epic documentary follows "two journeys: one historical, in search of a new life; one modern, in search of justice." Lost Years features interviews with Chinese Canadians and Chinese emigrants such as Larry Kwong, the first Chinese Canadian to play in the NHL, Norman Kwong, former professional athlete and Lieutenant Governor of Alberta, and Gim Wong, decorated RCAF officer and Chinese head tax redress advocate, amongst others.

Awards and nominations
Lost Years has been nominated for several awards, which includes the Golden Trailer Awards and Canadian Screen Awards. Director Kenda Gee has also received an Alumni Award of Excellence from the University of Alberta in recognition for his work with the documentary.

References

External links
 
 
 tribute.ca Website
 Radio New Zealand National – Voices: Lost Years – A People's Struggle for Justice – March 31, 2014

2011 films
Canadian documentary television films
Films about immigration in Canada
Films about Chinese Canadians
2011 documentary films
2010s Canadian films